Pearl Art and Craft Supply (formerly known as Pearl Paint) was a chain of art supply stores. Founded in 1933, Pearl was headquartered in Fort Lauderdale, Florida and had stores located throughout the U.S. including New Jersey, Florida, New York, and Massachusetts.

The chain once consisted of as many as 18 stores in total. After 81 years in business, a cash skimming scandal and subsequent bankruptcy forced the shuttering of company stores beginning in 2010 and culminated with the final closure of the Fort Lauderdale headquarters on August 26, 2014.

History
Long before it became a commercial chain, the New York Pearl Paint store served professional artists and the trades for decades at its Canal Street location in lower Manhattan. It was instrumental in identifying this neighborhood as an artist destination.  It was well placed in this busy art metropolis to benefit from the many nearby artist studios, art galleries, art supply houses, and art schools. The neighborhood itself was a destination and a magnet for tourists, gallery visitors, and the curious. The crowded, multi-floor store supplied a large inventory and diverse variety of materials, while adding to the identity of the sometimes quirky retail stores nearby. The proximity to other large and specialty art suppliers, such as New York Central Supply, Utrecht Linens, David Davis, and others created a regional destination for commerce in professional art materials. NYU, Cooper Union, The School of Visual Arts, Parsons School of Design, Fashion Institute of Technology, and other institutions helped anchor this identity even before the blossoming of the Tribeca, SoHo, and Chelsea neighborhoods during the last quarter of the 20th century.  The subsequent renovation proposal of the building used this iconic identity and history in its marketing.

The slow demise of Pearl Paint began in 1996 when a box of cash broke open while being shipped by UPS. The quantity of cash inside the parcel led to an investigation that revealed a daily skimming of the store's cash receipts, leading eventually to a prison sentence for Robert Perlmutter, to management from outside the family, and to subsequent bankruptcy. Also cited in this 2017 interview with the family were a lack of interest in the art supply industry, a decline in sales after the September 11, 2001 attacks, illness, all compounding the difficulties from the criminal settlement against Robert Perlmutter which barred him from participating in any management or decision making.

Immediately preceding the closure of the Fort Lauderdale headquarters building was the closures of the South Miami branch on July 20, 2014, and their famous New York City flagship location on April 17, 2014. Pearl Art sold art supplies, such as colored pencils, paint, sketch pencils, etc.

References

Retail companies of the United States
SoHo, Manhattan
Arts and crafts retailers